Vammala is a former town and municipality of southwestern Finland, chartered in 1907. On 1 January 2009, Vammala was consolidated with the municipalities of Mouhijärvi and Äetsä, to form a new city named Sastamala.

Geography
Vammala was located in the southwest Pirkanmaa region, and was part of the former (1997 to 2010) province of Western Finland.

Demographics

The municipality was unilingually Finnish.

See also
St. Olaf's Church in Tyrvää

References

External links

Official Vammala website

Sastamala
Former municipalities of Finland
Populated places established in 1907
Populated places disestablished in 2009
2009 disestablishments in Finland